The Indian locomotive class WDP-1 is a class of diesel-electric locomotive that was developed in 1995 by Banaras Locomotive Works (BLW) for Indian Railways. The model name stands for broad gauge (W), Diesel (D), Passenger traffic (P) engine, 1st generation (1). They entered service in 1995. A total of 69 WDP-1 units were built at Banaras Locomotive Works (BLW), Varanasi between 1995 and 1999.

The WDP-1 served both passenger and freight trains for over 25 years. Despite the introduction of more modern types of locomotives like WDG-4 and electrification, a significant number are still in use, both in mainline and departmental duties. As of April 2022, 44 locomotives still retain "operational status" on the mainline.

History 

The WDP-1 is a lower powered version of the WDM-2. These locos have a 2300 hp powerpack, . The engine is a converted version of the Alco 251C model with a 12-cylinder engine and low overall weight with a max. speed of 140 km/h, Bo-Bo fabricated bogies loosely based on the Flexicoil models. They are still in service and are homed either at TKD & BZA to haul short commuter trains and shunting around the area. They look just like all other ALCOs and are easily identified by the laterally “sculpted” and baldie grille-less short hood.

WDP1M  is a rebuilt version with better powerpack and better cooling via a modified radiator. The biggest change is in the suspension. Rubber springs have been provided instead of coil springs, along with other changes to the suspension and axle components.

The scrapping of these locomotives has begun.

Locomotive sheds

See also 
 Indian locomotive class WDM-2 
 List of diesel locomotives of India
 Rail transport in India#History
 Rail transport in India

References 

 https://www.rdso.indianrailways.gov.in/works/uploads/File/WDP1M%20Final%20speed%20certificate.pdf

P-1
Banaras Locomotive Works locomotives
Bo-Bo locomotives
5 ft 6 in gauge locomotives
Railway locomotives introduced in 1995